The Aston Martin DB11 is a grand tourer produced by British luxury car manufacturer Aston Martin since 2016. It debuted at the Geneva Motor Show in March 2016 as a replacement to the DB9. It is the first model launched in Aston Martin's 'second century' plan and the company's tie-up with Daimler AG.

Design
New design features include new roof strakes that separate the body from the roof, available in black or body colour, and the "Aeroblade" intakes in the front strakes.

The bonnet is a 'clam-shell' design made from a single piece of aluminium. The DB11 does not use the older Aston Martin VH platform but makes use of an all-new riveted and adhesive-bonded aluminium platform that shifts the emphasis from extrusions to stampings (including those formed using the innovative Hot Form Quench / HFQ process) to create more cockpit space which would also underpin future Aston Martin models; including the Vantage.

Production
During the DB11 coupé premiere, over 1,400 cars were ordered. Production officially started on 28 September 2016. To demonstrate commitment to quality, the CEO of Aston Martin at the time, Andy Palmer, checked the first 1,000 cars himself.

Reception
The reaction from the motoring press reviews has been positive, including statements such as "it's a pretty fabulous way to sit behind 600 horsepower" from Car and Driver. Matt Prior of Autocar awarded the DB11 a perfect five stars in his review saying, "If there is a GT car with a better chassis, I have not driven it." Jack Rix of Top Gear Magazine was also positive in his review stating, "A solid start to a future portfolio that will be studded with flashier and faster members than this, but none that are quite so suited to being enjoyed every day, wherever you're heading."

Motoring journalist Jeremy Clarkson quoted: "If you're ever in Paris, at a party at 3am, and suddenly remember you are playing in a tennis tournament in Monte Carlo the next afternoon, this is the car for the job. You'd arrive feeling like you'd just got out of the bath. It's not just a pretty face. This is an extremely good car. Phenomenally good. But there is a price to pay." He did not like the interior of the car he tested.

The car won the prestigious Golden Steering Wheel Award from Axel Springer which crowned it the most beautiful car of 2017.

Variants

DB11 V12 

The DB11 V12 is powered by an all-new  twin-turbocharged V12 engine called the AE31, making it the first turbocharged series-production Aston Martin. The new V12 retains conventional fuel injection and not direct injection because of worries over increased particulate output with DI petrols. Aston Martin also decided against a dry-sump lubrication system, instead optimizing a wet-sump design to perform under the high-g loading sustained when owners drive on a track. The car is equipped with a rear-mounted 8-speed automatic transmission manufactured by ZF Friedrichshafen.

In May 2018, Aston Martin unveiled the DB11 AMR—the replacement for the outgoing DB11 V12 which is more potent and performance-oriented than its predecessor. The predecessor DB11 V12 had been in production for only 18 months and it is believed this move was substantially due to the new V8 DB11 performing better than expected, narrowing the performance gap with the V12.

Other unique features include a more aggressive exhaust note in Sport & Sport+ mode, black roof, dark interior trim and new 3.5 kg lighter, 20-inch forged alloy wheels.

Aston Martin produced a limited run of 100 DB11 AMR Signature Edition cars at the start of production featuring a Stirling Green paint scheme with Lime Green accents; similar to that found on the Vantage GTE race car, black interior trim with lime green stitching and gloss black forged 20-inch alloy wheels. Deliveries began in the summer of 2018.

In July 2021, Aston Martin announced it had dropped the AMR name to the V12-powered DB11 as part of their updated model lineup.

DB11 V8 

The initial V12 model was joined by an entry-level V8 version in the summer of 2017. In July 2021, Aston Martin announced an upgrade for the DB11 V8.

DB11 Volante 

Aston Martin launched a convertible version of the DB11 in 2018 called the DB11 Volante (Italian for Flying). Aston Martin announced that they have no plans of fitting their 5.2-litre AE31 twin-turbocharged V12 engine on the Volante as the car already weighs  more than the V8 coupé due to the myriad of chassis stiffening components, as well as to keep the structural integrity of the Volante intact and stable at high speeds.

References

External links

Grand tourers
Coupés
Rear-wheel-drive vehicles
Front mid-engine, rear-wheel-drive vehicles
DB11
Cars introduced in 2016